Michael Gross may refer to:
Michael Gross (artist) (1920–2004), Israeli painter, sculptor and conceptual artist
Michael L. Gross (chemist) (born 1940), American professor of chemistry, medicine, and immunology
Michael Gross (actor) (born 1947), American actor
Michael Gross (writer) (born 1952), American author and journalist
Michael L. Gross (ethicist) (born 1954), political and medical ethicist
Michael Gross (science writer) (born 1963), American science journalist
Michael Joseph Gross (born 1970), American author and journalist
Michael Gross (editor), television editor, writer, and director
Michael C. Gross (1945–2015), American artist, film producer, art director of National Lampoon magazine
Michael Gross (swimmer) (born 1964), German swimmer, multiple Olympic champion